Anthony Aylmer Hillary (28 August 1926 – 20 June 1991) was an English cricketer. Hillary was a right-handed batsman who bowled right-arm off break.

Born at Shenfield, Essex, Hillary studied at the University of Cambridge, while there he played a single first-class cricket match for the university cricket club against Sussex at Fenner's in 1951. In a match which ended as a draw, Hillary batted once, scoring 49 runs in Cambridge University's first-innings before being dismissed by James Langridge. He later played minor counties cricket for Berkshire, debuting in the 1954 Minor Counties Championship against Cornwall. He played minor counties cricket for Berkshire until 1962, making 67 appearances.

He died at Truro, Cornwall on 20 June 1991.

References

External links
Anthony Hillary at ESPNcricinfo
Anthony Hillary at CricketArchive

1926 births
1991 deaths
People from Shenfield
Alumni of the University of Cambridge
English cricketers
Cambridge University cricketers
Berkshire cricketers